Pat Dannaher (16 October 1912 – 2 February 1999) was a South African sprinter. He competed in the men's 100 metres at the 1936 Summer Olympics.

References

1912 births
1999 deaths
Athletes (track and field) at the 1936 Summer Olympics
South African male sprinters
Olympic athletes of South Africa
Sportspeople from Bloemfontein